Christophers is a surname. Notable people with the name include:
Ben Christophers (born 1969), English musician
Sir Harry Christophers (born 1953), English conductor
Phil Christophers (born 1980), English rugby union player
Philip Christophers (1871–1946), Canadian politician
Rickard Christophers  (1873–1978), English entomologist specialising in mosquitoes
Sarah Christophers (born 1986), Australian-born Filipino actress

See also
The Christophers, Christian inspirational group founded in 1945

Surnames from given names